Singapore competed at the  2022 Commonwealth Games in Birmingham, England from 28 July to 8 August 2022. This was Singapore's seventeenth appearance at the twenty-second edition of the Games.

The Singapore team consisted of 67 athletes, 33 men and 34 women competing in 9 sports. Badminton athlete Terry Hee and powerlifter Nur Aini Yasli were the country's opening ceremony flagbearers.

Competitors
Singapore received a quota of 51 open allocation slots from Commonwealth Sport. This quota is used to determine the overall team in sports lacking a qualifying system.

The following is the list of number of competitors participating at the Games per sport/discipline.

Medalists
At the closing ceremony, Feng Tianwei was awarded the David Dixon Award. This award is given to an athlete who demonstrates the highest level of performance, dedication and fair play. Feng is also the Games' most decorated Singapore athlete.

Athletics

Singapore selected fourteen athletes on 15 June 2022.

Men
Track and road events

Field events

Women
Track and road events

Field events

Badminton

As of 1 June 2022, Singapore qualified for the mixed team event via the BWF World Rankings. Singapore entered ten players in the Games.

Singles

Doubles

Mixed team

Summary

Squad

Loh Kean Yew
Jason Teh
Loh Kean Hean
Terry Hee
Andy Kwek
Yeo Jia Min
Jin Yujia
Tan Wei Han
Insyirah Khan
Crystal Wong

Group stage

Quarterfinals

Semifinals

Bronze medal match

Gymnastics

A squad of ten gymnasts was announced on 28 June 2022.

Artistic
Men
Individual Qualification

Women
Team Final & Individual Qualification

Individual Finals

Rhythmic
Team Final & Individual Qualification

Lawn bowls

Para powerlifting

As of 27 May 2022, Singapore qualified one powerlifter through the World Para Powerlifting Commonwealth Rankings (for performances between 1 January 2020 and 25 April 2022).

Swimming

Singapore selected eleven swimmers on 27 May 2022, plus one para swimmer who qualified through the World Para Swimming World Rankings (for performances between 31 December 2020 and 18 April 2022).

Men

Women

Mixed

Table tennis

Singapore qualified for both the men's and women's team events via the ITTF World Team Rankings (as of 2 January 2020). Eight players were selected as of 1 July 2022.

Singles

Doubles

Team

Weightlifting

Six weightlifters from Singapore (3 men & 3 women) qualified for the competition.

Men

Women

Wrestling

Singapore selected three wrestlers on 27 May 2022.

References

External links
Singapore National Olympic Council Official site

Nations at the 2022 Commonwealth Games
2022
2022 in Singaporean sport